Esko is a Finnish name.

Esko may also refer to:
 Esko, Minnesota
 Esko (company), a Belgian graphic arts company
 Esko Prague, a commuter rail system
 Esko Moravian-Silesian Region, a commuter rail system